Joan Coromines i Vigneaux (also frequently spelled Joan Corominas; Barcelona, Catalonia, Spain 1905 – Pineda de Mar, Catalonia, Spain, 1997) was a linguist who made important contributions to the study of Catalan, Spanish, and other Romance languages.

His main works are the Diccionario crítico etimológico de la lengua castellana (1954-1957), in four volumes, first version of his etymological dictionary of Spanish (with an abridged version, Breve diccionario etimológico de la lengua castellana, first published in 1961); the Diccionari etimològic i complementari de la llengua catalana, which investigates the origin of most words in the Catalan language (9 volumes); the Onomasticon Cataloniae, documenting place and person names, old and new, in all the Catalan-speaking territories (8 volumes); and, with José Antonio Pascual, the Diccionario crítico etimológico castellano e hispánico, the most thorough etymological dictionary of Spanish extant today. Following this research, he—along with Koldo Mitxelena—made key contributions to the study of the Basque language's geographical extent across the Pyrenees during the early Middle Ages.

Coromines studied at the University of Barcelona, and started working on linguistics from an early age. At the same time, he held strongly Catalanist convictions all his life. He was forced into exile after the Spanish Civil War, eventually holding a professorship at the University of Chicago, in 1948. He returned to Catalonia later, and spent his last years working on his main works: the etymological dictionaries and the Onomasticon.

He refused several prizes from the Spanish government, in protest at the treatment of the Catalan language and culture in Spain.

In honor of Coromines, in April 2006 the University of Chicago inaugurated the Càtedra Joan Coromines d'Estudis Catalans, a teaching chair for visiting professors of Catalan language and literature.

References

Bibliography

External links
 Webpage devoted to Joan Coromines (lletrA (UOC), Catalan Literature (Online) 

1905 births
1997 deaths
People from Barcelona
Linguists from Catalonia
University of Barcelona alumni
Premi d'Honor de les Lletres Catalanes winners
Members of the Institute for Catalan Studies